Dor Rajput (also known as Doda) are a Rajput clan of India.

In the late tenth century, the Dor Rajputs "seem to have extended their sway" over parts of Northern India, "ruling at first as feudatories of Tomara kings of Delhi", they "became more powerful and made Koil as their stronghold". An 1876 account stated:

An 1880 work noted that "Dor Rajputs have disappeared from Rajputána where they were once famous and included in the thirty-six royal races. ... They are still found in small numbers in the North-West Provinces". The city of Vadodara is reported to have previously been named Chandanavati for a time, "for Raja Chandan of the Dor Rajputs, who wrested it from the Jainas".

References

Rajput clans